Megachile habropodoides is a species of bee in the family Megachilidae. It was described by Meade-Waldo in 1912.

References

Habropodoides
Insects described in 1912